You're Gonna Hear From Me is a live album by jazz pianist Bill Evans with Eddie Gómez and Marty Morell recorded at the Jazzhus Montmartre in Copenhagen in 1969 but not released until 1988 on the Milestone label. The same concert also produced the album Jazzhouse.

Reception
The AllMusic review by Scott Yanow awarded the album 4 stars and states "Evans' regular trio of the time is in exuberant form performing before an enthusiastic crowd... An excellent all-around set".

Track listing
All compositions by Bill Evans except where noted.
 "You're Gonna Hear From Me" (Dory Previn, André Previn) - 3:02
 "'Round Midnight" (Thelonious Monk) - 6:22
 "Waltz for Debby" - 5:29
 "Nardis" (Miles Davis) - 8:59
 "Time Remembered" - 5:02
 "Who Can I Turn To (When Nobody Needs Me)" (Leslie Bricusse, Anthony Newley) - 6:23
 "Emily" (Johnny Mandel, Johnny Mercer) - 5:01
 "Love Is Here to Stay" (George Gershwin, Ira Gershwin) - 3:54
 "Someday My Prince Will Come" (Frank Churchill, Larry Morey) - 5:51

Personnel
Bill Evans - piano
Eddie Gómez - bass
Marty Morell - drums

References

Bill Evans live albums
1988 live albums
Milestone Records live albums
Albums recorded at Jazzhus Montmartre